The 1978 Greenlandic Men's Football Championship was the 8th edition of the Greenlandic Men's Football Championship. The final round was held in Nuuk. It was won by Nagdlunguaq-48 for the second time in its history.

Final round

See also
Football in Greenland
Football Association of Greenland
Greenland national football team
Greenlandic Men's Football Championship

References

Greenlandic Men's Football Championship seasons
Green
Green
Foot